Zoey Clark (born 25 October 1994) is a British sprinter. She competed in the women's 400 metres and was part of the British 4 × 400 relay team that won the silver medal at the 2017 World Championships in Athletics. Since then she has won two international bronzes in the relay and most recently a silver in the same event at the 2019 European Athletics Indoor Championships. She was selected as part of the 4x400m relay team for the Tokyo 2020 Olympic Games.

In January 2022, she struck national double gold at Glasgow's Emirates Arena, winning the 60m in 7.50secs after a battle with Leeds athlete Hilary Gode, before going on to lower her Scottish record to 23.36sec with her win in the 200m. That was an improvement on the 23.58 she ran at the same venue four years previously.

References

External links

1994 births
Living people
Place of birth missing (living people)
British female sprinters
Scottish female sprinters
Commonwealth Games competitors for Scotland
Athletes (track and field) at the 2018 Commonwealth Games
World Athletics Championships athletes for Great Britain
World Athletics Championships medalists
World Athletics Indoor Championships medalists
European Athletics Championships medalists
British Athletics Championships winners
Members of Thames Valley Harriers
Athletes (track and field) at the 2020 Summer Olympics
Olympic athletes of Great Britain
Sportspeople from Aberdeen
Commonwealth Games bronze medallists for Scotland
Commonwealth Games medallists in athletics
Athletes (track and field) at the 2022 Commonwealth Games
Medallists at the 2022 Commonwealth Games